Jan Zeegers (28 March 1902 – 29 November 1978) was a Dutch middle-distance runner. He competed in the 1500 metres at the 1924 Summer Olympics and the 1928 Summer Olympics. He was an older brother of middle-distance runner Guus Zeegers.

References

External links
 

1902 births
1978 deaths
Athletes (track and field) at the 1924 Summer Olympics
Athletes (track and field) at the 1928 Summer Olympics
Dutch male middle-distance runners
Dutch male long-distance runners
Dutch male steeplechase runners
Olympic athletes of the Netherlands
Athletes from Amsterdam